Teluk Dalam is a district of the Simeulue Regency on Simeulue island in the Indonesian province of Aceh.  At the 2010 Census it had a total population of 5,091 people, living in 1,043 households in 2005.

Administrative divisions
Teluk Dalam is divided administratively into 10 desa/kelurahan:

 Babussalam
 Bulu Hadik
 Gunung Putih
 Kuala Bakti
 Kuala Baru
 Luan Balu
 Lugu Sebahak
 Muara Aman
 Sambay
 Tanjung Raya

References

Districts of Aceh